Synagogidae is a family of crustaceans belonging to the order Laurida.

Genera:
 Cardomanica Lowry, 1985
 Flatsia Grygier, 1991
 Gorgonolaureus Utinomi, 1962
 Isidascus Moyse, 1983
 Parasothorax Wagin, 1964
 Sessilogoga Grygier, 1990
 Synagoga Norman, 1888
 Thalassomembracis Grygier, 1984
 Waginella Grygier, 1983

References

 
Crustacean families